This is a list of awards and nominations received by Vidyasagar, an Indian composer, musician and singer who predominantly works in Tamil, Malayalam, Telugu and Hindi film industries.

Honorary

Government

Other

Film awards and nominations

Asianet Film Awards

Asiavision Awards

Filmfare Awards

Kerala State Film Awards

Kerala Film Critics Association Awards

Mirchi Music Awards

National Film Awards

Tamil Nadu State Film Awards

Other Awards

Nandi Awards
2004 – Best Music Direction – Swarabhishekam
Volga River Side Film Festival Award
2007 – Best Music Direction – Periyar
Vanitha Film Awards
2008 – Best Music Direction – Mulla
Mathrubhumi Film Awards
2009 – Best Music Direction – Neelathamara
Kerala Film Producers Association Awards
2014 – Best Music Director – Geethaanjali

Nominations
Vijay Awards
2007 – Best Music Direction – Mozhi
SIIMA Awards
2012 – Best Music Direction – Diamond Necklace

References

External links
 Vidyasagar Official Website

Awards
Vidyasagar